State Opera may refer to :

 Bavarian State Opera, Munich, Germany
 Berlin State Opera
 Hamburg State Opera
 Staatsoper Hannover
 Sächsische Staatsoper Dresden
 Hungarian State Opera House
 Vienna State Opera
 Prague State Opera